My Whole World Ended is the 1969 debut solo album of David Ruffin, who had risen to fame as lead singer of  The Temptations from 1964 to 1968. Released on Motown Records, My Whole World Ended features the title track, as well as other tracks produced by in-house Motown producers such as Harvey Fuqua, Johnny Bristol, Paul Riser and Ivy Jo Hunter.

Track listing 

Side One
 "My Whole World Ended (The Moment You Left Me)" (Harvey Fuqua, Jimmy Roach, Johnny Bristol, Pam Sawyer)
 "Pieces of a Man" (Johnny Bristol, Pam Sawyer)
 "Somebody Stole My Dream" (Henry Cosby, Joe Hinton, Pam Sawyer)
 "I've Lost Everything I've Ever Loved" (Johnny Bristol, Thomas Kemp)
 "Everlasting Love" (Buzz Cason, Mac Gayden)
 "I've Got To Find Myself a Brand New Baby" (Harvey Fuqua, Johnny Bristol, Marv Johnson, Suzanne de Passe)

Side Two
 "The Double Cross" (Allen Story, George Gordy)
 "Message from Maria" (Al Reed)
 "World of Darkness" (Harvey Fuqua, Thomas Kemp)
 "We'll Have a Good Thing Going On" (Allen Story, George Gordy)
 "My Love Is Growing Stronger" (Johnny Bristol, Marv Johnson)
 "Flower Child" (Johnny Bristol, Doris McNeil)

Chart history

Singles

References 

1969 debut albums
David Ruffin albums
Albums produced by Harvey Fuqua
Albums produced by Johnny Bristol
Albums produced by Ivy Jo Hunter
Motown albums
Albums arranged by Paul Riser